Founded in 1972 as Corporación de Ahorro y Vivienda Las Villas. In 1997 it became a subsidiary of Grupo Aval.

External links
 Official Website

Banks of Colombia
Banks established in 1972
Companies based in Bogotá